Tibubeneng is a village in the south of Bali, Indonesia.

Tibubeng was part of Canggu until it was split off in 1997. It is headed by an elected perbekel, or village head. The village has five elementary schools and one junior high school. The majority of the inhabitants follow Balinese Hinduism, although there is a large Muslim minority. In 2018, as part of the Berawa Beach Festival, a total of 5,555 kecak dancers performed simultaneously, setting a world record.

Notes

References
 
 
 
 

Badung Regency